The Athens Charter for the Restoration of Historic Monuments is a seven-point manifesto adopted at the First International Congress of Architects and Technicians of Historic Monuments in Athens in 1931.

Manifesto 
The Athens Charter for the Restoration of Historic Monuments was produced by the participants of the First International Congress of Architects and Technicians of Historic Monuments organized by the International Museums Office and held in Athens in 1931.

The seven points of the manifesto are:
 to establish organizations for restoration advice
 to ensure projects are reviewed with knowledgeable criticism 
 to establish national legislation to preserve historic sites
 to rebury excavations which were not to be restored. 
 to allow the use of modern techniques and materials in restoration work.
 to place historical sites under custodial protection.
 to protect the area surrounding historic sites.

See also 
 Venice Charter – Charter for the Conservation and Restoration of Monuments and Sites
 Florence Charter – by ICOMOS on 15 December 1982 as an addendum to the Venice Charter
 Barcelona Charter – European Charter for the Conservation and Restoration of Traditional Ships in Operation
 Building restoration
 Historic preservation

External links 
  The Athens Charter for the Restoration of Historic Monuments 
 The Florence Charter
 The Barcelona Charter

Architectural history
Historic preservation
Archaeology
20th century in Athens
1931 in international relations
International cultural heritage documents
Conservation and restoration of cultural heritage
1931 in Greece
1931 documents